Lakeside-Beebe Run is a census-designated place (CDP) in Hopewell Township, in Cumberland County, in the U.S. state of New Jersey. It is in the northern part of the county, on the eastern side of the township, on high ground overlooking Sunset Lake to the east and Mary Elmer Lake to the south. It is bordered to the south by the city of Bridgeton, the county seat.

Lakeside-Beebe Run was first listed as a CDP prior to the 2020 census.

Demographics

References 

Census-designated places in Cumberland County, New Jersey
Census-designated places in New Jersey
Hopewell Township, Cumberland County, New Jersey